Victor Ivanovich Motschulsky  (sometimes Victor von Motschulsky, 11 April 1810, in St. Petersburg – 5 June 1871, in Simferopol) was a Russian entomologist mainly interested in beetles.

Motschulsky was an Imperial Army colonel who undertook extended trips abroad. He studied and described many new beetles from Siberia, Alaska, the United States, Europe, and Asia. While he tended to ignore previous work and his own work on classification was of poor quality, Motschulsky made a massive contribution to entomology, exploring hitherto unworked regions, often in very difficult terrain. He described many new genera and species, a high proportion of which remain valid.

Travels
Motschulsky's travels included:
1836 - France, Switzerland and the Alps, northern Italy and Austria
1839–1840 - Russian Caucasus, Astrakhan, Kazan and Siberia
1847 - Khirgizia
1850–1851 - Germany, Austria, Egypt, India, France, England, Belgium and Dalmatia
1853 - United States of America, Panama, returning to St. Petersburg via Hamburg, Kiel and Copenhagen
1853 - Germany, Switzerland and Austria

Works
Motschulsky published 45 works, mostly on biogeographic, faunistic or systematic aspects of entomology. Many of these works are based on studies of insect collections that were created by a large number of other naturalists, especially Russians who had been to Siberia. Most of his works are on Coleoptera, but some are on Lepidoptera and Hemiptera. He also made collections of other arthropod groups including myriapods sometimes describing species under the name of "Victor".

A selection of more important works revealing Motschulsky's scope:

Die Kaefer Russlands. I. Insecta Carabica. Moscow: Gautier, vii + 91 pp. + 9 tables. (1850).

Études entomologiques. 10 volumes (1852–1861).

 Motschulsky, V. I.. "Coléoptères de la Sibérie orientale et en particulier des rives de l'Amour". In: Schrenk’s Reisen und Forschungen im Amurlande 2: 77–257, 6 color plates, St. Petersburg (1861).

Catalogue des insectes reçus du Japon. Bulletin de la Société Impériale des Naturalistes de Moscou 39 (1): 163–200 (1866).

Collection
Motschulsky's vast collection is divided between Moscow State University, the Zoological Museum of Saint Petersburg, the Natural History Museum of Berlin and the German Entomological Institute.

Sources

Essig, E.O., 1972. A History of Entomology. Hafner Publishing Co., New York. 1,029 pp.

Coleopterists
Russian lepidopterists
Biologists from the Russian Empire
Scientists from Saint Petersburg
1810 births
1871 deaths